Jagannath Bharadwaj was an Indian politician. He was a Member of Parliament, representing Himachal Pradesh in the Rajya Sabha the upper house of India's Parliament as a member of the Indian National Congress.

References

Rajya Sabha members from Himachal Pradesh
Indian National Congress politicians
1916 births
1987 deaths